Forever is a Dutch-language television series that was broadcast by AVROTROS on NPO Zapp. The series is a remake of the Belgian program 4eVeR and is about the lives of four friends Sal (portrayed by Yassine Kji in season 1 and by Hamza Othman in season 2), Dex (Koen van der Molen), Bloem (Manouk Pluis) and Noa (Selin Akkulak), who come from completely different families.

Cast

Release
Forever was released on February 19, 2018 on AVROTROS.

References

External links
 

Dutch-language television shows
2018 Dutch television series debuts
2019 Dutch television series endings
2010s Dutch television series
NPO 3 original programming